Ian Steedman (born 1941, in London) was for many years a professor of economics at the University of Manchester before moving down the road to Manchester Metropolitan University. He retired from there at the end of 2006, but was appointed as an emeritus professor.

His work 
Steedman has been recognised as one of the leading Neo-Ricardian economic theorists with work in the areas overlapping with those of Marx, Sraffa, Marshall, Jevons and Wicksteed. He has also made contributions to economic theory on time, international trade, capital theory and growth and distribution.

He is also a senior research fellow at the William Temple Foundation, and his work now includes the study of "happiness" and its relation to welfare economics.

Books 
  
 Trade Amongst Growing Economies, 1979
 
 From Exploitation to Altruism. Polity Press, Cambridge, 1989.
 Socialism and Marginalism in Economics, 1870–1930, Routledge, 1995. (as Editor and Contributor) 
 Consumption takes Time. Implications for Economic Theory, Routledge, London, 2001.

Chapters in books

Papers 

Economic Theory and Intrinsically Non-Autonomous Preferences and Beliefs. Quaderni Fondazione Feltrinelli. (Proceedings of the Seminar in Economic Methodology), No. 7/8, 1980.
(with U. Krause) Goethe's Faust, Arrow's possibility theorem and the individual decision taker. In J. Elster (ed.), The Multiple Self, C.U.P., 1986.
Rationality, economic man and altruism in Philip H. Wicksteed's Common Sense of Political Economy. (In) Truth, Liberty, Religion: Essays celebrating two hundred years of Manchester College, Oxford, (ed. B.A. Smith), 1986.
Trade interest versus class interest. Economia Politica vol. 3, 1986.
The Economic Journal and Socialism, 1890 to 1920, (in) J.D. Hey and D. Winch (eds.), A Century of Economics, Oxford, Basil Blackwell, 1990.
P.H. Wicksteed on Das Kapital, Volume I, (in) D. Moggridge (ed.), Perspectives on the History of Economic Thought, Volume III, Classicals, Marxians and Neo-classicals, Edward Elgar, Aldershot 1990.
'Worker versus worker', (in) S. Kozyr-Kowalski and A. Przestalski (eds.), On Social Differentiation. A Contribution to the Critique of Marxist Ideology, Adam Mickiewicz University Press, Poznan, 1992.
John Carruthers: A Victorian market socialist, European Journal for the History of Economic Thought, 1994.
P.H. Wicksteed: Economist and Prophet, (in) H.G. Brennan and A.M.C. Waterman (eds.), Economics and Religion; Are they distinct?, Kluwer Academic Publishing, 1994.
Welfare Economics and Robinson Crusoe the Producer, Metroeconomica, 2000, 51(2), 151–167.
On some concepts of rationality in economics, in P. E. Earl & S. F. Frowen (eds) Economics as an Art of Thought: Essays in memory of G.L.S. Shackle, 2000, London, Routledge, 101–123.
British economists and philosophers on Marx's value theory, 1920–1925. Journal of the History of Economic Thought, 2004.
Philip Henry Wicksteed, entry in the new Oxford Dictionary of National Biography, 2004.
On not traducing economics. (In) J. Atherton and   H. Skinner (eds.), Through the Eye of a Needle, Epworth Press, 2007

Other academic duties 
Ian Steedman is on the editorial board of The European Journal of the History of Economic Thought.

References 

British economists
Living people
1941 births
Socialist economists